George Thomas Nostrand  (January 25, 1924 – November 8, 1981) was an American professional basketball player.

A 6'8" (2.03 m) forward/center from High Point University (1941–1944) and the University of Wyoming (1944–1945), Nostrand played four seasons (1946–1950) in the National Basketball Association as a member of the Toronto Huskies, Cleveland Rebels, Providence Steamrollers, Boston Celtics, Tri-Cities Blackhawks, and Chicago Stags.  He averaged 8.2 points per game in his professional career.

Nostrand is perhaps best known for appearing in a series of Canadian newspaper advertisements to promote the first National Basketball Association game, a November 1, 1946 contest between Nostrand's Toronto Huskies and the New York Knicks. The advertisements promised that anyone taller than Nostrand would receive free admission to the opening game.

BAA/NBA career statistics

Regular season

Playoffs

References

External links

1924 births
1981 deaths
American expatriate basketball people in Canada
American men's basketball players
Basketball players from New York (state)
Boston Celtics players
Centers (basketball)
Chicago Stags players
Cleveland Rebels players
Forwards (basketball)
High Point Panthers men's basketball players
Providence Steamrollers players
Toronto Huskies players
Tri-Cities Blackhawks players
Wyoming Cowboys basketball players